The 1986 San Francisco 49ers season was the franchise's 37th season in the National Football League and their 41st overall. The team returned to the top of the NFC West after a one-year absence, and lost in the divisional playoffs to the Giants. This was the first of five consecutive NFC West titles for the 49ers.

Joe Montana suffered a back injury in Week 1 and was lost for two months after surgery. Because the injury was so severe, Montana's doctors suggested that Montana retire. However, Montana returned for Week 10 against the St. Louis Cardinals, where he passed for 270 yards and three touchdown passes in a 43–17 49er victory. Montana appeared in just eight games this season, and threw more interceptions than touchdown passes for the only time in his career. Montana shared Comeback Player of the Year honors with Minnesota's Tommy Kramer at the end of the season.

Offseason

Personnel

Staff

Roster

Regular season

Schedule

Standings

Playoffs

NFC Divisional Playoff 
 San Francisco 49ers 3, New York Giants 49

January 4, 1987, at Giants Stadium, East Rutherford, New JerseyAttendance: 76,034

Awards and records 
 Ronnie Lott, Franchise Record, Most Interceptions in One Season, 10 interceptions
 Joe Montana, NFL Comeback Player of the Year
 Jerry Rice, Led NFC, Receptions, 86 receptions
 Jerry Rice, led NFL with 1,570 receiving yards
 Jerry Rice, led NFL with 15 touchdowns.

References

External links 
 1986 49ers on Pro Football Reference
 49ers Schedule on jt-sw.com

San Francisco
NFC West championship seasons
San Francisco 49ers seasons
1986 in San Francisco
San